The House is the fourth studio album by British-Georgian singer Katie Melua, released on 24 May 2010 by Dramatico. This is Melua's first studio album not to be produced by Mike Batt. The first single from the album, "The  Flood", was released on 17 May 2010 and was written by Melua, Guy Chambers and Lauren Christy. The second single A Happy Place was released in July 2010, featuring a remix of the track by Sparks. The third single To Kill You With A Kiss (called I'd Love To Kill You on the album) was released at the end of November 2010.

Track listing
All tracks produced by William Orbit.

Personnel
Katie Melua - lead vocals, guitar
Tim Harries - bass, piano on track 12
Luke Potashnick - guitars
Steve Donnelly - guitars
Henry Spinetti - drums
Arden Hart - keyboards

Additional musicians
B J Cole - pedal steel on tracks 1, 5, 9
Dominic Miller - guitar on tracks 5, 9
Jim Watson - piano on track 2
Keith Brazil - drums on track 3
Paul Stanborough - mandolin on track 2
Fergus Gerrand - drums on tracks 2, 6, 9-11
William Orbit - kalimba on track 6

Chart positions
In the United Kingdom, the album debuted at #4 with 29,611 copies sold in its first week.

End of year charts

Certifications

References

2010 albums
Katie Melua albums
Albums produced by William Orbit